North Asmat is a Papuan language of West New Guinea, spoken by the Asmat people. Dialects are Momogo, Pupis and Irogo.

References

Asmat-Kamoro languages
Languages of western New Guinea